Nuth is a railway station located in Nuth, Netherlands. The station was built in 1893 and opened in 1896. It is located on the Sittard–Herzogenrath railway. Train services are operated by Arriva.

Train services
The following local train services call at this station:
Stoptrein: Sittard–Heerlen–Kerkrade

External links

NS website 
Dutch public transport travel planner 

Railway stations in Limburg (Netherlands)
Railway stations opened in 1893
Beekdaelen